The Chaldean Catholic Archdiocese of Erbil is a Chaldean Catholic diocese with its seat in Erbil, Kurdistan Region. Erected in 1968 with territory taken from the Archeparchy of Kirkuk, it is immediately subject to the Patriarchal See of Babylon. The see of the archbishop is the Cathedral of St. Joseph (Mar Yousif) in Ankawa, a suburb of Erbil.

Under Archbishop Bashar Warda, the archdiocese expanded its activity by creating the Catholic University in Erbil and several youth and healthcare agencies. In particular, the Archdiocese took a leading role in the care of Christians displaced from Mosul and the Nineveh Plains after the ISIS invasion of those areas in 2014.  During this period, Ankawa and Erbil became the center of Christianity in Iraq.

Ordinaries
Stéphane Babaca (1969–1994)
Hanna Markho (1994–1996)
Jacques Ishaq (1997–1999)
Yacoub Denha Scher (2001–2005)
Bashar Warda (2010–present)

References

External links
Chaldean Archdiocese of Erbil                    
GCatholic.org                   
Catholic Hierarchy.org entry

Chaldean Catholic dioceses
Eastern Catholicism in Iraq
Erbil
Christian organizations established in 1968